Rhens is a former Verbandsgemeinde ("collective municipality") in the district Mayen-Koblenz, in Rhineland-Palatinate, Germany. The seat of the municipality was in Rhens. On 1 July 2014 it merged into the new Verbandsgemeinde Rhein-Mosel.

The Verbandsgemeinde Rhens consisted of the following Ortsgemeinden ("local municipalities"):

 Brey 
 Rhens
 Spay 
 Waldesch

Former Verbandsgemeinden in Rhineland-Palatinate